The meridian 124° west of Greenwich is a line of longitude that extends from the North Pole across the Arctic Ocean, North America, the Pacific Ocean, the Southern Ocean, and Antarctica to the South Pole.

The 124th meridian west forms a great circle with the 56th meridian east.

From Pole to Pole
Starting at the North Pole and heading south to the South Pole, the 124th meridian west passes through:

{| class="wikitable plainrowheaders"
! scope="col" width="130" | Co-ordinates
! scope="col" | Country, territory or sea
! scope="col" | Notes
|-
| style="background:#b0e0e6;" | 
! scope="row" style="background:#b0e0e6;" | Arctic Ocean
| style="background:#b0e0e6;" |
|-
| style="background:#b0e0e6;" | 
! scope="row" style="background:#b0e0e6;" | Beaufort Sea
| style="background:#b0e0e6;" |
|-
| style="background:#b0e0e6;" | 
! scope="row" style="background:#b0e0e6;" | M'Clure Strait
| style="background:#b0e0e6;" |
|-
| 
! scope="row" | 
| Northwest Territories — Banks Island
|-
| style="background:#b0e0e6;" | 
! scope="row" style="background:#b0e0e6;" | Beaufort Sea
| style="background:#b0e0e6;" | Burnett Bay
|-
| 
! scope="row" | 
| Northwest Territories — Banks Island
|-
| style="background:#b0e0e6;" | 
! scope="row" style="background:#b0e0e6;" | Amundsen Gulf
| style="background:#b0e0e6;" |
|-valign="top"
| 
! scope="row" | 
|-
| style="background:#b0e0e6;" | 
! scope="row" style="background:#b0e0e6;" | Strait of Georgia
| style="background:#b0e0e6;" |
|-
| 
! scope="row" | 
| British Columbia — Vancouver Island; passing through Nanaimo
|-
| style="background:#b0e0e6;" | 
! scope="row" style="background:#b0e0e6;" | Strait of Juan de Fuca
| style="background:#b0e0e6;" |
|-valign="top"
| 
! scope="row" | 
| Washington Oregon — from 
|-
| style="background:#b0e0e6;" | 
! scope="row" style="background:#b0e0e6;" | Pacific Ocean
| style="background:#b0e0e6;" | Passing just west of the coast of Oregon, 
|-valign="top"
| 
! scope="row" | 
| Oregon California — from 
|-
| style="background:#b0e0e6;" | 
! scope="row" style="background:#b0e0e6;" | Pacific Ocean
| style="background:#b0e0e6;" |
|-
| style="background:#b0e0e6;" | 
! scope="row" style="background:#b0e0e6;" | Southern Ocean
| style="background:#b0e0e6;" |
|-
| 
! scope="row" | Antarctica
| Unclaimed territory
|-
|}

See also
123rd meridian west
125th meridian west

w124 meridian west